The São Paulo state elections of 2006 was held along with Brazilian general elections, on October 1 and on October 29, 2006. Since 1994, as a result of a constitutional amendment which reduced the presidential term to four years, all federal and state elections in Brazil have coincided. The state elections decide Governors and the state deputies for the Legislative Assemblies. Also, the members of the National Congress are elected by state.

Governor and Vice-Governor
In general, the rules of the presidential ballot also apply to the gubernatorial one. That is, the ballot is taken in two rounds, if no one reaches at least an absolute majority of the valid votes, a second round between the two most voted candidates will be held. All the candidates holding executive posts had to renounce till April 2, 2006 in order to be able to run.

The candidates for Governor of São Paulo were, in no particular order:

 The Brazilian Social Democracy Party (PSDB) – was the governing party, but governor Geraldo Alckmin could not run for reelection. Thus, the party had to appoint a new name for the run. After governor Alckmin was selected as the presidential candidate on a dispute with the state capital mayor José Serra, it was proposed that Serra should be the candidate for the state government.
 Workers' Party (PT) – the main opposition party in the state held primaries and chose Aloízio Mercadante, senator of São Paulo in the fourth year of his term (the term of a senator in Brazil is eight years-long).
 Brazilian Democratic Movement Party (PMDB) – chose former governor of São Paulo Orestes Quércia as their candidate.
 Other candidates included Plinio de Arruda Sampaio (PSOL) and Carlos Apolinário (PDT)

Results

References

2006 Brazilian gubernatorial elections
October 2006 events in South America
2006